Klippan may refer to:
Klippan, Scania, a town within the Klippan Municipality in Skåne County, Sweden, 
Klippan Municipality, a municipality in Skåne County, Sweden
Klippan (Gothenburg), a district of Gothenburg, Sweden
Klippan (sofa), a popular sofa manufactured and sold by IKEA